Koinambe Airport is a small airfield serving the village of Koinambe in the Jimi District of Jiwaka Province, Papua New Guinea.

References 

Airports in Papua New Guinea